Don Leogal is a Dominica professional manager.

In 2004–2005 he was a head coach of the Dominica national football team.

References

Year of birth missing (living people)
Living people
Dominica football managers
Dominica national football team managers
Place of birth missing (living people)